Neptuneopsis is a genus of sea snails, marine gastropod mollusks in the family Volutidae.

Species
Species within the genus Neptuneopsis include:

 Neptuneopsis gilchristi Sowerby III, 1898

References

Volutidae
Monotypic gastropod genera